Market abolitionism is the belief that the economic market should be completely eliminated from society. Market abolitionists argue that markets are ethically abhorrent, antisocial and fundamentally incompatible with long term human and environmental survival.

In large countries in the modern world, the only significant alternative to a market economy has been central planning as was practiced in the early Soviet Union and in the People's Republic of China before the 1990s. Other proposed alternatives to the market economy (participatory planning as proposed in the theory of participatory economics (parecon), an artificial market as proposed by advocates of Inclusive Democracy and the idea of substituting a gift economy for a commodity exchange) have not yet been tried on a large scale in the modern industrialized world.

Nonetheless, anarchists believe that alternative organizational methods have been implemented successfully during short periods of time, namely the early stages of the Russian Revolution before it was taken over by the Bolsheviks and the Spanish Revolution before it was crushed by the alliance of liberals and Marxist–Leninists.

Proponents 
Michael Albert, creator of Znet and co-creator of participatory economics, considers himself a market abolitionist and favors democratic participatory planning as a replacement. He and several colleagues, including Robin Hahnel have elaborated their theory of parecon in books, on ZNet and in Z Magazine.

Notably, Noam Chomsky is one of those who have expressed the opinion that a truly free market (in the context of a sudden transition from the current system) would destroy the species as well as physical environment. He also favors a democratic participatory planning process as a replacement to the market.

Criticism 
Economists such as Milton Friedman, Friedrich Hayek and Brink Lindsey argue that if the market is eliminated along with property, prices and wages, then the mode of information transmission is eliminated and what will result is a highly inefficient system for transmitting the value, supply, demand, of goods, services and resources, along with an elimination of the most efficient mode of market transactions.

See also 
 Murray Bookchin
 Parecon

References

External links 
 Albert, Michael (20 September 2001). "Markets Über Alles?". ZNet. Z Communications. . Retrieved 23 January 2020.
 Doszyn, Mariusz (13 June 2004). "Market Madness". ZNet. Z Communications.  Retrieved 23 January 2020.

Anti-capitalism
Anarcho-communism
Capitalism
Communism
Economic ideologies
Libertarian socialism
Market (economics)
Marxism
Schools of economic thought
Socialism